Pedlar may refer to:

The British English form and original spelling of peddler

Entertainment
 The Pedlar (or The Wayfarer), a painting by Hieronymus Bosch 
 The Isis Pedlar, a novel
 The Bold Pedlar and Robin Hood, a Child Ballad
 Robin Hood and the Pedlars, a Child Ballad
 Pedlar of Swaffham, a folktale

People

Given names and nicknames
Thomas Palmer known as Pedlar Palmer (1876–1949), British boxer who held the world bantamweight championship, 1895–1899
Alfred Brian Palmer (1899–1993), Royal Navy captain who had the nickname "Pedlar Palmer"

Surnames
Arthur Vercoe Pedlar (1932–2022), British clown
David Pedlar, Director of Research at the National Headquarters of Veterans Affairs Canada
Philip Pedlar (1899–?), Welsh professional footballer
Sylvia Pedlar (1901–1972), American lingerie designer

Places
Pedlar, West Virginia
Pedlar River, Virginia
Pedlar Wildlife Management Area in Monongalia County, West Virginia

Other
 Pedlar (fur trade), fur traders in colonial North America